George Peter Nairn-Briggs was a Provost then the Dean of Wakefield. He is also the author of several books.He was born on 5 July 1945 and educated at  Slough Technical High School  and began his working life in local authority housing after which he was a press officer for MAFF. From 1966 he began to study for the priesthood, firstly at King's College London and then at St Augustine's College, Canterbury. He held curacies at St Laurence, Catford and then St Saviour, Raynes Park. After this he was Vicar of Christ the King, Salfords and then St Peter, St Helier (Bishop Andrewes) in Morden. He was the Bishop of Wakefield’s Advisor for Social Responsibility between  1987 and 1997,  and a Canon Residentiary at Wakefield cathedral from 1992. He was then promoted to lead the staff at the Cathedral Church of All Saints, his job title (if not his role) changing in 2000.

References

1945 births
Living people
People educated at Herschel Grammar School
Alumni of King's College London
Associates of King's College London
Provosts and Deans of Wakefield